The 1938 USC Trojans football team represented the University of Southern California (USC) in the 1938 college football season. In their 14th year under head coach Howard Jones, the Trojans compiled a 9–2 record (6–1 against conference opponents), finished in a tie for the Pacific Coast Conference championship, defeated Duke in the 1939 Rose Bowl, and outscored their opponents by a combined total of 172 to 65.

Schedule

References

USC
USC Trojans football seasons
Pac-12 Conference football champion seasons
Rose Bowl champion seasons
USC Trojans football